The second Amato government was the 56th government of the Italian Republic, the fourth and last government of the XIII Legislature. It held office from 26 April 2000 to 11 June 2001, a total of 412 days, or 1 year, 1 month and 17 days.

The government obtained the confidence of the Chamber of Deputies on 28 April 2000 with 319 votes in favour and 298 against., and the confidence of the Senate on 3 May 2000 with 179 votes in favour, 112 against and 2 abstentions.

Amato resigned on 31 May 2001, at the end of the legislature.

Party breakdown

Ministers

Ministers and other members
 Independents: Prime minister, 2 ministers and 3 undersecretaries
 Democrats of the Left (DS): 7 ministers and 19 undersecretaries
 Italian People’s Party (PPI): 5 ministers and 12 undersecretaries
 The Democrats (Dem): 3 ministers and 7 undersecretaries
 Federation of the Greens (FdV): 2 ministers and 2 undersecretaries
 Party of Italian Communists (PdCI): 2 ministers and 2 undersecretaries
 Union of Democrats for Europe (UDEur): 1 minister and 5 undersecretaries
 Italian Renewal (RI): 1 minister and 4 undersecretaries
 Italian Democratic Socialists (SDI): 1 minister and 2 undersecretaries

Composition

Notes

Italian governments
2000 establishments in Italy
2001 disestablishments in Italy
Cabinets established in 2000
Cabinets disestablished in 2001